Xingning District is one of 7 districts of the prefecture-level city of Nanning, the capital of Guangxi Zhuang Autonomous Region, South China.

References

External links 

County-level divisions of Guangxi
Nanning